Małgorzata Dłużewska-Wieliczko (born 11 March 1951 in Koronowo) is a Polish rower.

References 
 
 

1951 births
Living people
Polish female rowers
People from Bydgoszcz County
Rowers at the 1980 Summer Olympics
Olympic silver medalists for Poland
Olympic rowers of Poland
Olympic medalists in rowing
Sportspeople from Kuyavian-Pomeranian Voivodeship
World Rowing Championships medalists for Poland
Medalists at the 1980 Summer Olympics